Sailor's Holiday is a 1929 American pre-Code sound comedy film directed by Fred C. Newmeyer and produced and distributed by Pathé Exchange. The film was also released in a silent version.

The film is preserved at the Library of Congress.

Plot

Cast
Alan Hale as Adam Pike
Sally Eilers as Molly Jones
George Cooper as Shorty
Paul Hurst as Jimmylegs
Mary Carr as Mrs. Pike
Charles Clary as Captain
Jack Richardson as Captain
Natalie Joyce as The Fast Worker
Phil Sleeman as Her Secretary
Ray Cooke as Sailor in Cafe (uncredited)
Russ Powell as Midway Customer (uncredited)
Randolph Scott as Undetermined Role (uncredited)
Rolfe Sedan as Ferris Wheel Barker (uncredited)
Slim Summerville as Midway Photographer (uncredited)
Grady Sutton as Sailor Extra in Cafe (uncredited)

References

External links

1929 films
Films directed by Fred C. Newmeyer
Silent American comedy films
1929 comedy films
American black-and-white films
Pathé Exchange films
1920s English-language films
Films with screenplays by Joseph F. Poland
1920s American films